Aita Mare  is a commune in Covasna County, Transylvania, Romania composed of two villages: Aita Mare and Aita Medie (Középajta).

It formed part of the Székely Land region of the historical Transylvania province.

Demographics

The commune has an absolute Székely Hungarian majority. According to the 2011 Census it has a population of 1,771 of which 90.9% or 1,559 are Hungarian.

Gallery

References

External links
https://web.archive.org/web/20121103233215/http://www.panoramio.com/photo/18310007   Aita Mare pictures

Communes in Covasna County
Localities in Transylvania